Alias the Deacon may refer to:
 Alias the Deacon (1927 film), an American silent drama film
 Alias the Deacon (1940 film), an American comedy film